Senator McBroom may refer to:

Ed McBroom (born 1981), Michigan State Senate
Edward McBroom (1925–1990), Illinois State Senate